Pamela Blake (August 6, 1915 – October 6, 2009) was an American film actress who acted in almost 50 films. She is known primarily for her roles in western films and serials.

Early years
Blake was born in Oakland, California as Adele Pearce, and performed under that name until 1942. Following her mother's death when Blake was 3 years old, she went to live with an uncle and aunt, William Bojorques and Gertrude Biddle-Bojorques in Petaluma, California. Her secondary education came at schools in Petaluma and San Francisco.

She went to Hollywood at age 17 after she won a beauty contest.

Film
Blake's film career lasted for a little over 15 years, with her starring mostly in B-movies. Her first film role was uncredited, playing a bit part in the 1934 film Eight Girls on a Boat. However, in 1938 she starred in the western The Utah Trail alongside Tex Ritter. ("It was terrible!" she said in later years. "I never saw it and never wanted to.") She also starred opposite John Wayne in the 1939 film Wyoming Outlaw. This helped her to secure several other western acting roles, many times as the lead heroine.

In 1939 she starred in five films, one of which was a crime drama, one a mystery, and one a western. In total she had roles in some 54 films, as well as a number of starring roles in certain television series. In 1946 she starred in Chick Carter, Detective. Toward the end of her career, she mostly played parts in western genre films and television episodes, such as The Range Rider.

Waco (1952) was Blake's last feature film, and her last role was in the 1954 television pilot, The Adventures of the Texas Kid: Border Ambush, which was later released as a film.

Personal life and death
In 1935, Blake was injured in an automobile wreck that might have ended her career. A newspaper article in The Petaluma Argus-Courier in 1940 described her as having emerged from the wrecked car "with a neck badly torn and both eyes and cheeks badly mutilated." Plastic surgery helped her to return to acting.

Blake married three times. In 1936, she eloped to Yuma, Arizona, with actor Malcolm "Bud" Taggert. They divorced in 1940. Her second marriage, in 1943, was to actor, television producer and writer Mike Stokey; it ended in divorce in 1948. They had one son, Mike Stokey II, and a daughter, Barbara. Their son served as a 1st Marine Division combat correspondent during the Vietnam War, and who then began working in the film industry as a military technical advisor, having worked with, among others, Steven Spielberg and Tom Hanks.

In 1953, Blake moved to Las Vegas, Nevada, to retire and raise her two children. She married John Canavan, an Air Force master sergeant, in 1983. Blake died of natural causes in a Las Vegas, Nevada care facility in 2009, at age 94.

Filmography

References

External links

B-movie heroines, Pamela Blake

1915 births
2009 deaths
American film actresses
Actresses from Oakland, California
20th-century American actresses
Burials at Southern Nevada Veterans Memorial Cemetery
21st-century American women